Starfleet Command may refer to:

Video games
 Star Trek: Starfleet Command, a computer game based on the table-top wargame Star Fleet Battles
 Star Trek: Starfleet Command II: Empires at War, the sequel to Starfleet Command and second in the series of real-time space combat games
 Star Trek: Starfleet Command: Orion Pirates, a stand-alone expansion for the computer game Star Trek: Starfleet Command II: Empires at War
 Star Trek: Starfleet Command III, a Star Trek video game published in 2002

Other
 Starfleet Command, the headquarters of, the fictional Star Trek exploration agency